Chey Chettha I (1575–1595) was a king of Cambodia who ruled from 1584 to 1595.

Chey Chettha was the second son of Satha I. He was appointed as heir apparent when he was eleven. He was crowned by his father in 1584.

In 1594, Cambodia was attacked by Siam. After the Siamese army reached Lovek, Chey Chettha assumed his uncle Soryopor the direct command of the defenses.

Chey Chetta fled the capital with his father, Satha, first to Srey Santhor, then to Stung Treng. He died there in 1595 without an heir.

See also
Siamese–Cambodian War (1591–1594)
Preah Ram I

References

1575 births
1595 deaths
16th-century Cambodian monarchs